Anatoliy Doroshenko (14 August 1953) is an association footballer from the former Soviet Union who played for FC Chornomorets Odessa.

In 1979 Doroshenko played couple of games for Ukraine at the Spartakiad of the Peoples of the USSR.

References

External links
 Profile at the football.odessa.ua
 Anniversary of the Odessa football legend. Odessa city portal. 14 August 2013.

1953 births
Living people
Soviet footballers
Ukrainian footballers
FC Chornomorets Odesa players
SKA Odesa players
FC Elektrometalurh-NZF Nikopol players
FC Kryvbas Kryvyi Rih players
FC Zirka Kropyvnytskyi players
Ukrainian football managers
Association football midfielders
K. D. Ushinsky South Ukrainian National Pedagogical University alumni
Sportspeople from Odesa Oblast